Rodolfo Lipizer (January 16, 1895 – June 8, 1974), was an Italian violinist, professor of music, and orchestra conductor.

Lipizer was born in Gorizia, Italy.  The International Violin Competition “Rodolfo Lipizer Prize” is named in his honour.

External links 
International Violin Competition “Rodolfo Lipizer Prize” official site
Biography

1895 births
1974 deaths
Italian male composers
Italian violinists
Male violinists
People from Gorizia
Italian people of Austrian descent
20th-century Italian composers
20th-century violinists
20th-century Italian male musicians